Afrophylax is a monotypic genus of flies in the family Tachinidae.

Species
Afrophylax aureiventris (Villeneuve, 1910)

Distribution
Democratic Republic of the Congo, Nigeria, Sierra Leone, Tanzania, Uganda.

References

Diptera of Africa
Exoristinae
Tachinidae genera
Monotypic Brachycera genera
Monotypic insect genera